The women's 200 metres event at the 2003 Asian Athletics Championships was held in Manila, Philippines on September 22–23.

Medalists

Results

Heats
Wind: Heat 1: +1.4 m/s, Heat 2: -0.3 m/s Heat 3: +0.5 m/s

Final
Wind: + 0.5 m/s

References

2003 Asian Athletics Championships
200 metres at the Asian Athletics Championships
2003 in women's athletics